Lambis is a genus of large sea snails sometimes known as spider conchs, marine gastropod mollusks in the family Strombidae, the true conch family.

Description

The siphonal canal is long and curved, and the apertural lip is adorned with circumapertural projections, which are fingerlike processes emanating from the edge of the shell aperture.

Species
Species within the genus Lambis include:
 Lambis arachnoides 
 Lambis crocata 
 Lambis lambis 
 Lambis lilikae Villar, 2016
 Lambis millepeda 
 Lambis montorum T. Cossignani & Lorenz, 2020
 Lambis pilsbryi 
 Lambis robusta 
 Lambis scorpius 
 Lambis truncata 

Species brought into synonymy 
 Lambis adamii  : synonym of Lambis lambis 
 Lambis aratrum Röding, 1798: synonym of Euprotomus aratrum (Röding, 1798) (original combination)
 Lambis arthritica  : synonym of Harpago arthriticus 
 Lambis aurantia  : synonym of  Lambis crocata 
 Lambis bryonia (Gmelin, 1791): synonym of Lambis truncata ([Lightfoot], 1786)
 Lambis bulla Röding, 1798: synonym of Euprotomus bulla (Röding, 1798) (original combination)
 Lambis carinata Röding, 1798: synonym of Margistrombus marginatus (Linnaeus, 1758)
 Lambis carnaria Röding, 1798: synonym of Persististrombus latus (Gmelin, 1791): synonym of Thetystrombus latus (Gmelin, 1791)
 Lambis carnea Röding, 1798: synonym of Persististrombus latus (Gmelin, 1791): synonym of Thetystrombus latus (Gmelin, 1791)
 Lambis cerea Röding, 1798: synonym of Lambis lambis (Linnaeus, 1758)
 Lambis chiragra  : synonym of Harpago chiragra 
 Lambis cristinae : synonym of Lambis scorpius indomaris Abbott, 1961 (hybrid of L. scorpius indomaris x L. lambis)
 Lambis curruca Röding, 1798: synonym of Tricornis tricornis ([Lightfoot], 1786)
 Lambis decora Röding, 1798: synonym of Conomurex decorus (Röding, 1798)
 Lambis digitata : synonym of Ophioglossolambis digitata 
 Lambis flammeus Link, 1807: synonym of Conomurex persicus (Swainson, 1821)
 Lambis fragilis Röding, 1798: synonym of Terestrombus fragilis (Röding, 1798) (original combination)
 Lambis gibbosa Röding, 1798: synonym of Gibberulus gibberulus gibbosus (Röding, 1798) (original combination)
 Lambis harpago Röding, 1798: synonym of Harpago chiragra (Linnaeus, 1758)
 Lambis hermaphrodita Röding, 1798: synonym of Lambis lambis (Linnaeus, 1758) 
 Lambis indomaris : synonym of Lambis scorpius indomaris Abbott, 1961
 Lambis labiata Röding, 1798: synonym of Canarium labiatum (Röding, 1798) (original combination)
 Lambis laciniata Röding, 1798: synonym of Lambis lambis (Linnaeus, 1758)
 Lambis lamboides Röding, 1798: synonym of Lambis lambis (Linnaeus, 1758)
 Lambis lobata Röding, 1798: synonym of Lambis lambis (Linnaeus, 1758)
 Lambis lobata Röding, 1798 (: 65): synonym of Sinustrombus sinuatus ([Lightfoot], 1786)
 Lambis maculata Röding, 1798: synonym of Lambis lambis (Linnaeus, 1758)
 Lambis picta Röding, 1798: synonym of Sinustrombus latissimus (Linnaeus, 1758)
 Lambis pipa Röding, 1798: synonym of Lentigo pipus (Röding, 1798) (original combination)
 Lambis plicata Röding, 1798: synonym of Dolomena plicata (Röding, 1798) (original combination)
 Lambis rana Röding, 1798: synonym of Lentigo lentiginosus (Linnaeus, 1758)
 Lambis reticulata Link, 1807: synonym of Canarium labiatum (Röding, 1798) (uncertain synonym)
 Lambis rugosa (G. B. Sowerby II, 1842): synonym of Harpago chiragra rugosus (G. B. Sowerby II, 1842)
 Lambis sebae : synonym of Lambis truncata sebae (Kiener, 1843)
 Lambis sowerbyi : synonym of Lambis truncata sowerbyi (Mörch, 1872)
 Lambis turturella Röding, 1798: synonym of Laevistrombus turturella (Röding, 1798) (original combination)
 Lambis undulata Röding, 1798: synonym of Harpago chiragra (Linnaeus, 1758)
 Lambis velum Röding, 1798: synonym of Lobatus gallus (Linnaeus, 1758): synonym of Aliger gallus (Linnaeus, 1758)
 Lambis violacea : synonym of Ophioglossolambis violacea 
 Lambis vomer Röding, 1798: synonym of Euprotomus vomer (Röding, 1798) (original combination)
 Lambis wheelwhrighti Greene, 1978: synonym of Lambis arachnoides Shikama, 1971

References

 Vaught, K.C. (1989). A classification of the living Mollusca. American Malacologists: Melbourne, FL (USA). . XII, 195 pp.

Strombidae
Cenozoic first appearances
Taxa named by Peter Friedrich Röding
Taxonomy articles created by Polbot